Sarila is a town, a former princely state and a nagar panchayat in Hamirpur district in the northern Indian state of Uttar Pradesh.

Geography 
It is situated on Rath-Jalapur Road or MDR-41B.

Administration

Local self government
Sarila is governed by a municipality under the Uttar Pradesh Municipal Act. The council is called a nagar panchayat.

Sub district administration
Sarila is the headquarters of the subdivision, which is headed by a sub-divisional magistrate (S.D.M.), who is assisted by four officers: one tehsil magistrate and nayab tehsil magistrates.

Police administration
Sarila city's security is maintained by Sarila Kotwali. Sarila police circle is headed by CO sarila.

Demographics 
 India census, Sarila had a population of 7,858. Males constitute 53% of the population and females 47%. Sarila has an average literacy rate of 49%, lower than the national average of 59.5%: male literacy is 64%, and female literacy is 33%. In Sarila, 17% of the population is under six years of age.

History 

Maharaja Chhatrasal conquered the area now known as Bundelkhand from the Mughals in the 17th century. One of his grandsons, Raja Pahar Singh of Jaitpur, received Sarila, built Sarila fortress and in 1755 founded the Hindu princely state covering 91 km2.

In 1807 Sarila accepted a British protectorate and became a non-salute state under the colonial Bundelkhand Agency.
 
It had a population of 6,298 in 1901 and a state revenue of 59,147 rupees. The privy purse would be fixed at 18,650 rupees.

The state ceased to exist on 1 January 1950 by accession to Madhya Pradesh.

Ruling rajas 
The rulers bore the title of raja.

 Raja Aman Singh, 1st Raja of Sarila 1755/1788, son of Raja Pahar Singh of Jaitpur, died 1778
 Raja Tej Singh, 2nd Raja of Sarila 1788/1818, son of the above
 Raja Anirudh Singh, 3rd Raja of Sarila 1818/1842, son of the above
 Raja Hindupat Singh, 4th Raja of Sarila 1842/1871, died childless
 Raja Khallak Singh, 5th Raja of Sarila 1871/1882
 Raja Pahar Singh, 6th Raja of Sarila 1882/1898, born 1875, son of the above, died 1898
 .... -Regent 11 September 1898 – 5 Nov 1919 
 Raja Mahipal Singh Ju Deo, 1919-1947

Sites and services 
Jhanda bazaar and Nestle market is a famous area of Sarila's city center.

Historical places 
There are many historical places, princely palace, Hindu temples and mosques located in Sarila.

Sri Shalleshwar Mandir, located in Jhanda Bazar locality, is the oldest Hindu temple in Sarila. Every year on the occasion of Maha Shivratri, a marriage procession of Lord Shiva is carried out in the whole town. A large crowd from nearby villages gathers around to take part in this.
Kalka Mandir, located on Mamna Road, is the temple of goddess Kali.

Education 
A number of senior secondary and secondary schools are available in Sarila:
 Sri Shalleshwar inter college 
 Government Inter College
 Government I.T.I.
 Sarswati Shishu/Vidhya Mandir inter college  
 Abhinav Pragya pg Mahavidhyalaya

Banks 
 Allahabad Bank
 Hamirpur District Co-operative Bank Ltd.
 State Bank of India
 Allahabad UP Gramin Bank
 Aryavart Bank Sarila

References

Sources and external links 
 Indian Princely States on www.uq.net.au as archived on web.archive.org, with coats of arms and genealogy
 WorldStatesmen - India - Princely States K-Z

Cities and towns in Hamirpur district, Uttar Pradesh